Igor Petrovich Vladimirov (1 January 1919, Yekaterinoslav – 20 March 1999, Saint Petersburg) was a Soviet film and theater actor, theater and film director, and teacher. People's Artist of the USSR (1978). From 1960 until his death in 1999 he was the Principal Director of the Lensovet Theatre in Leningrad.

Awards and titles
 Medal "For the Victory over Germany in the Great Patriotic War 1941–1945"
Medal "For the Defence of Leningrad" (1945)
Medal "For Valiant Labour in the Great Patriotic War 1941–1945" (1946)
Medal "In Commemoration of the 250th Anniversary of Leningrad" (1957)
Honored Art Worker of the RSFSR (1966)
Jubilee Medal "In Commemoration of the 100th Anniversary of the Birth of Vladimir Ilyich Lenin" (1970)
 People's Artist of the RSFSR (1974)
 People's Artist of the USSR (1978)
 Order of the Red Banner of Labour (1979)
Order of Lenin (1990)
 Order of Friendship (1994)

References

External links 

  Igor Vladimirov on IMDb 
 Website memory of Igor Vladimirov

1919 births
1999 deaths
People's Artists of the RSFSR
People's Artists of the USSR
Recipients of the Order of Lenin
Recipients of the Order of the Red Banner of Labour
Soviet male film actors
Soviet male stage actors
Soviet theatre directors